Season 1 of the Indian Tamil-language competitive cooking reality TV series MasterChef India – Tamil which premiered on 7 August 2021 on Sun TV. The show is hosted by actor and producer Vijay Sethupathi, while professional chefs Harish Rao, Aarthi Sampath and Koushik S serve as judges for this season. Shali Nivekas was the guest host for episode 11 instead of Vijay Sethupathi due to the celebration episode of Vinayaka Chaturti.

Devaki Vijayaraman, an Homebaker from Trichy, Tamil Nadu was declared as the winner on 14 November 2021, with Nithya Franklyn of Thoothukudi, Tamil Nadu being the runner-up.

Format
Top 24 home cooks were chosen from the auditions from the state of Tamil Nadu. From them, only 14 advanced home cooks were selected to participate in the main competition.

Top 14
Source for all first names, hometowns, and occupations.

Elimination Table

 (WIN) The cook won the Mystery Box challenge, or any other individual / pair challenge.
 (TOP) The cook was one of the top entries in an individual challenge but didn't win.
 (WEAK) The cook was one of the bottom entries in an individual challenge.
 (BTM) The cook was one of the bottom entries in an individual challenge and had to compete in the upcoming elimination challenge.
 (IN) The cook wasn't selected as a top or bottom entry in an individual / pair challenge.
 (WIN) The cook was on the winning team in a team challenge and directly advanced to the next round.
 (SAFE) The cook didn't participate in the challenge as he/she already advanced to the next round.
 (LOSE) The cook was on the losing team in the team challenge and had to compete in the upcoming elimination challenge.
 (IN) The cook wasn't selected as a top or bottom entry in a team challenge.
 (RIGH) The cook has selected the right answer in an ingredient guessing challenge and saved from elimination test.
 (WRON) The cook has selected the wrong answer in an ingredient guessing challenge and had to participate in the elimination test.
 (IMN) The cook won an Immunity Pin in a given challenge.
 (LOST) The cook lost an Immunity Pin in a given challenge.
 (RET) The cook won the Wild Card Challenge and returned to the competition.
 (PT) The cook competed in an elimination test, and advanced.
 (SE) All the cooks are not being judged for their dish that specific episode since it's a special celebration episode.
 (ELIM) The cook was eliminated from MasterChef.
 (PELM) The cook eliminated from MasterChef Apron Challenge 1 and 2
 (OUT) The cook lost the first level of the ticket to finale challenge.
 (NEXT) The cook won the 1st round and advanced to the 2nd and final round of the ticket to finale challenge.
 (NO) The cook didn't participate in the 2nd level of the ticket to finale challenge.
 (LOSE) The cook lost the 2nd level of the ticket to finale challenge.
 (WIN) The cook won the Ticket to Finale Challenge and was directly promoted as a finalist.
 (WINNER) The cook is the winner of the season.
 (RUNNER-UP) The cook is the runner up of the season.

Guest Appearances 
 Nikki Galrani
 Remya Nambeesan
 Gayathrie

Episodes

References

External links 

MasterChef India
2021 Indian television seasons
Sun TV original programming